The 1990 FIVB Volleyball Men's Club World Championship was the 2nd edition of the event. It was held in Milan, Italy from 1 to 2 December 1990.

Final standing

Awards
Most Valuable Player
 Claudio Galli (Mediolanum Milano)

External links
Honours

International men's volleyball competitions hosted by Italy
1990 in volleyball
1990 in Italian sport
1990
Volleyball World Championship,Men|1990
1990 FIVB Men's Club World Championship
December 1990 sports events in Europe